Martín Pascual Castillo (born 4 August 1999) is a Spanish professional footballer who plays as a central defender for UD Ibiza, on loan from Rayo Vallecano.

Career
Born in Madrid, Pascual joined Rayo Vallecano's youth setup in 2017, from AD Unión Adarve. He made his senior debut with the reserves on 26 August 2018, starting in a 2–1 Tercera División home win against CD San Fernando de Henares.

Pascual scored his first senior goal on 2 December 2018, netting the opener in a 3–2 loss at DAV Santa Ana, and finished the campaign with five goals in 30 appearances. He made his professional debut the following 17 August, starting and being sent off in a 2–2 home draw against CD Mirandés in the Segunda División.

On 19 July 2021, after contributing with six league appearances as his side achieved promotion to La Liga, Pascual was loaned to Villarreal CF B for one year. On 3 July 2022, after another promotion, he moved to second division side UD Ibiza also in a temporary deal.

Career statistics

Club

References

External links

1999 births
Living people
Footballers from Madrid
Spanish footballers
Association football defenders
Segunda División players
Primera Federación players
Tercera División players
Rayo Vallecano B players
Rayo Vallecano players
Villarreal CF B players
UD Ibiza players